Francisco "Frank" Rivera Paniagua (9 March 1928 – 31 October 2013) was a Puerto Rican sprinter who competed in the 1952 Summer Olympics and in the 1956 Summer Olympics. He won a bronze medal in the 1959 Pan American Games 4×400 metres relay. He was born in San Juan, Puerto Rico. Died in 2013 in San Juan. Served as a Corporal in the United States Marine Corps in Korea. He was buried at the Puerto Rico National Cemetery in Bayamón, Puerto Rico.

References

1928 births
2013 deaths
Sportspeople from San Juan, Puerto Rico
Puerto Rican male sprinters
Puerto Rican male middle-distance runners
Olympic track and field athletes of Puerto Rico
Athletes (track and field) at the 1952 Summer Olympics
Athletes (track and field) at the 1956 Summer Olympics
Pan American Games bronze medalists for Puerto Rico
Puerto Rican United States Marines
Athletes (track and field) at the 1955 Pan American Games
Athletes (track and field) at the 1959 Pan American Games
Pan American Games medalists in athletics (track and field)
United States Marines
Central American and Caribbean Games gold medalists for Puerto Rico
Competitors at the 1959 Central American and Caribbean Games
Central American and Caribbean Games medalists in athletics
Medalists at the 1959 Pan American Games
United States Marine Corps personnel of the Korean War